Zbyněk Drda (born 29 March 1987) is a  Czech singer. In December 2006, Drda became the winner of the third edition of Česko hledá SuperStar.

Biography
Drda comes from a Czech-Russian family. In his youth, he demonstrated an aptitude for music and sports, and took part in karate, volleyball, and lifeguarding.
Although he sang since he was a child, he gained fame only when he participated in the third season of the reality television singing competition Česko hledá SuperStar, the Czech version of the Idol series. Drda won third place on 17 December 2006.

After this victory, Drda recorded his debut album, titled Pohled do očí, which was released in April 2007. The record became a bestseller. In the 2007 Český slavík awards, Drda won the "Skokan roku", i.e. the Best Newcomer award. 

In 2018, Drda released his second solo album, titled Záhadná.

Česko hledá SuperStar performances

Discography
 Pohled do očí (2007)
 Záhadná (2018)

References

External links
 

1987 births
Living people
People from Ostrov (Karlovy Vary District)
Idols (TV series) winners
Czech pop singers
21st-century Czech male singers